Pule cheese or magareći sir, is a Serbian cheese made from 60% Balkan donkey milk and 40% goat's milk.

The cheese is produced in Zasavica Nature Reserve, as conceived by Slobodan Simić, Zasavica Special Nature Reserve Manager and former Serbian MP.

Pule is reportedly the "world's most expensive cheese", fetching US$1300 per kilogram. It is so expensive because of its difficulty to produce, and its rarity: there are only about 100 jennies in the landrace of Balkan donkeys that are milked for Pule-making and it takes  of milk to create  of cheese.

See also
 List of cheeses
 List of smoked foods

References

External links
 

Donkeys
Serbian cuisine
Serbian cheeses
Smoked cheeses
Cheeses by animal's milk